was a Japanese radio astronomer.  He founded the Nobeyama Radio Observatory.

The crater Hatanaka on the Moon is named after him.

References

External links
 http://www12.plala.or.jp/m-light/Nomenclature.htm (in Japanese)

1914 births
1963 deaths
20th-century Japanese astronomers